The Gordon River is a river in the Great Southern region of Western Australia.

Location and features
The headwaters of the river rise below Three Wells near Broomehill. The river flows in a south-westerly direction parallel with the Great Southern Highway as far as Tambellup then veers westward and crosses Albany Highway north of Cranbrook and discharges into the Frankland River of which it is a tributary.

The river flows through a number of pools during its journey, including Balbalingup Pool, Ballingup Pool, Boyacup Pool and Poolyup Pool.

The river has four tributaries: Wadjekanup River, Cowenup Brook, Slab Hut Gully and Uannup Brook.

The river was named in 1835 by Surveyor General John Septimus Roe during an expedition from Perth to Albany. The river is named after George Hamilton Gordon, the 4th Earl of Aberdeen, who later became the Prime Minister of the United Kingdom.

See also

References

Rivers of the Great Southern region